The Visual Effects Society Award for Outstanding Visual Effects in a Photoreal Picture is one of the annual awards given by the Visual Effects Society starting in 2002. While the award's title has changed several time within this period, the recipient has always been a visual effects-heavy feature film; film's with more background effects work have their own category, the Visual Effects Society Award for Outstanding Supporting Visual Effects in a Feature Motion Picture.

Winners and nominees

2000s
Outstanding Visual Effects in an Effects Driven Motion Picture

2010s

Outstanding Visual Effects in a Visual Effects-Driven Photoreal/Live Action Feature Motion Picture

Outstanding Visual Effects in a Photoreal Feature

2020s

External links
 Visual Effects Society

References

Visual Effects Society Awards
Awards established in 2002